Eleocharis acuta, commonly known as common spikerush or small spikerush, is a sedge of the family Cyperaceae that is native to Australia.

Description
It blooms between September and December producing brown flowers. It has fine upright cylinder-shaped deep-green foliage that tapers to a fine point.

Taxonomy
The species was first formally described by the botanist Robert Brown in 1810 as part of the work Prodromus Florae Novae Hollandiae. The name of the species is often misapplied to Eleocharis pallens.

Distribution and habitat
It is found widely through all Australian states, but not the Northern Territory. It is also found in New Zealand, New Guinea and Norfolk Island.
In Western Australia it is found in and around swamps and clay pans in the Mid West, Wheatbelt, Great Southern  and Goldfields-Esperance regions where it grows in sandy-peaty-clay soils.

It typically occurs in water or wet soil, seepage areas, freshwater lakes, and creek-beds.

Uses
It is able to grow in stationary to slowly moving water with a range extends from the coast to many inland areas. It is used in wetland area and is habitat for waterbirds as nesting material and the seeds as a food source.
The plant is sold commercially as it can form dense swards able to easily colonize shallow fresh water areas including along the edges of lagoons, dams, drainage lines and waterlogged low-lying areas.

References

Plants described in 1810
Flora of Western Australia
Flora of South Australia
Flora of Victoria (Australia)
Flora of New South Wales
Flora of Queensland
Flora of Tasmania
acuta
Taxa named by Robert Brown (botanist, born 1773)